William Grimston, 1st Viscount Grimston (31 December 1684 – 15 October 1756), of Gorhambury, St Albans, Hertfordshire, was a British landowner and politician who sat in the House of Commons between 1710 and 1734.

Grimston was born as William Luckyn, the younger son of Sir William Luckyn, 3rd Baronet, and his wife Mary Sherrington. In 1700 he succeeded to the estates, including Gorhambury near St Albans, of his great-uncle Sir Samuel Grimston, 3rd Baronet, of Bradfield, and assumed the surname of Grimston in lieu of Luckyn.

In 1705 he published a play 'The Lawyer's Fortune or Love in a Hollow Tree'. He married Jean Cooke, daughter of James Cooke, on 14 August 1706.

Grimston was returned unopposed as Member of Parliament for St Albans in the 1710 general election and was elected in a contest in 1713. His fortunes at the constituency were affected by the competitive ambitions of Sarah Duchess of Marlborough who also had an interest. Although he won the seat in 1715 he was defeated in 1722. In 1719 he was raised to the Peerage of Ireland as Baron Dunboyne and Viscount Grimston. As these were Irish peerages they did not prohibit Grimston from sitting in the British House of Commons. He regained the seat at St Albans in 1727 but lost it again in 1734.

In 1737 he succeeded his elder brother Sir Harbottle Luckyn as fifth Baronet. His feud with the duchess continued until her death as they each tried to prevent the return of each other's candidates at St Albans in subsequent elections. Although Grimston had tried to suppress all copies of his play, in 1736 the Duchess published a version of it with disparaging notes to mock him.
 
Grimston died in October 1756, aged 72. He and his wife had ten sons and three daughters. He was succeeded in his titles by his son James. Lady Grimston died in 1765.

References

Kidd, Charles, Williamson, David (editors). Debrett's Peerage and Baronetage (1990 edition). New York: St Martin's Press, 1990, 

1684 births
1756 deaths
Viscounts in the Peerage of Ireland
Peers of Ireland created by George I
Baronets in the Baronetage of England
William
Members of the Parliament of Great Britain for English constituencies
British MPs 1710–1713
British MPs 1713–1715
British MPs 1715–1722
British MPs 1727–1734